Eric VI may refer to:

Eric VI of Denmark
Eric VI of Sweden